The following is a list of French wines that are entitled to use the designation Appellation d'Origine Contrôlée (AOC) on their label. There are currently over 300 appellations acknowledged by the INAO.

{|class="wikitable sortable" style="text-align:left"
|-
! AOC
! Wine region
! Est. date
! Comments
|-
| Ajaccio || Corsica || 1984 || Before 1984 a designation within Corse or Vin du Corse under the alternative names Ajaccio or Coteaux d'Ajaccio
|-
| Aloxe-Corton || Burgundy || 1938 || 
|-
| Alsace || Alsace || 1945 || 
|-
| Alsace Grand Cru || Alsace || 1975 || 
|-
| Anjou || Loire || 1936 || 
|-
| Anjou-Coteaux de la Loire || Loire || 1946 || 
|-
| Anjou-Gamay || Loire || 1936 || 

|-
| Anjou mousseux || Loire || 1938 || 
|-
| Anjou Villages || Loire || 1991 || 
|-
| Anjou Villages Brissac || Loire || 1998 || 
|-
| Arbois || Jura || 1936 || 
|-
| Auxey-Duresses || Burgundy || 1970 || 
|-
| Bandol || Provence || 1941 || 
|-
| Banyuls || Languedoc-Roussillon || 1972 || 
|-
| Banyuls Grand Cru || Languedoc-Roussillon || 1972 || 
|-
| Barsac || Bordeaux || 1936 || 
|-
| Bâtard-Montrachet || Burgundy || 1937 || 
|-
| Béarn || South West France || 1975 || 
|-
| Beaujolais || Beaujolais || 1937 || 
|-
| Beaujolais-Villages || Beaujolais || 1937 || 
|-
| Beaumes de Venise || Rhône || 2005 || Before 2005 a part of Côtes du Rhône Villages
|-
| Beaune || Burgundy || 1936 || 
|-
| Bellet || Provence || 1941 || 
|-
| Bergerac || South West France || 1936 || 
|-
| Bergerac sec || South West France || 1936 || 
|-
| Bergerac rosé || South West France || 1936 || 
|-
| Bienvenues-Bâtard-Montrachet || Burgundy || 1937 || 
|-
| Blagny || Burgundy || 1970 || 
|-
| Blanquette de Limoux || Languedoc-Roussillon || 1981 || 
|-
| Blanquette méthode ancestrale || Languedoc || 1981 || 
|-
| Blaye || Bordeaux || 1936 || 
|-
| Bonnes-Mares || Burgundy || 1936 || 
|-
| Bonnezeaux || Loire || 1951 || 
|-
| Bordeaux || Bordeaux || 1936 || 
|-
| Bordeaux clairet || Bordeaux || 1936 || 
|-
| Bordeaux Côtes de Francs || Bordeaux || 1936 || 
|-
| Bordeaux Haut-Benauge || Bordeaux || 1936 || 
|-
| Bordeaux moelleux || Bordeaux || 1936 || 
|-
| Bordeaux rosé || Bordeaux || 1936 || 
|-
| Bordeaux sec || Bordeaux || 1936 || 
|-
| Bordeaux supérieur || Bordeaux || 1943 || 
|-
| Bourgogne || Burgundy || 1937 || 
|-
| Bourgogne aligoté || Burgundy || 1937 || 
|-
| Bourgogne clairet || Burgundy || 1937 || 
|-
| Bourgogne clairet Côte chalonnaise || Burgundy ||  || 
|-
| Bourgogne Coulanges-la-Vineuse || Burgundy ||  || 
|-
| Bourgogne Côte Saint-Jacques || Burgundy ||  || 
|-
| Bourgogne Coulanges-la-Vineuse || Burgundy ||  || 
|-
| Bourgogne Côtes d'Auxerre || Burgundy ||  || 
|-
| Bourgogne Côtes du Couchois || Burgundy ||  || 
|-
| Bourgogne Epineuil || Burgundy ||  || 
|-
| Bourgogne grand ordinaire || Burgundy ||  || 
|-
| Bourgogne Hautes-côtes de Beaune || Burgundy || 1937 || 
|-
| Bourgogne Hautes-côtes de Nuits || Burgundy || 1937 || 
|-
| Bourgogne La Chapelle Notre-Dame || Burgundy ||  || 
|-
| Bourgogne le Chapitre || Burgundy ||  || 
|-
| Bourgogne Montrecul || Burgundy ||  || 
|-
| Bourgogne mousseux || Burgundy ||  || 
|-
| Bourgogne ordinaire || Burgundy ||  || 
|-
| Bourgogne Passe-tout-grains || Burgundy || 1937 || 
|-
| Bourgogne Vézelay || Burgundy ||  || 
|-
| Bourgogne rosé || Burgundy || 1937 || 
|-
| Bourgueil || Loire || 1937 || 
|-
| Bouzeron || Burgundy || 1998 || AOC under this name in 1998, the designation Bourgogne aligoté Bouzeron existed since 1937
|-
| Brouilly || Beaujolais || 1938 || 
|-
| Bugey || Bugey || 2009 || 
|-
| Buzet || South West France || 1973 || Originally under the name Côtes de Buzet, changed to Buzet in 1986
|-
| Cabardes || Languedoc-Roussillon || 1999 || As VDQS also known under the alternative name Côtes du Cabardès et de l'Orbiel
|-
| Cabernet d'Anjou || Loire || 1964 || 
|-
| Cabernet de Saumur || Loire || 1964 || 
|-
| Cadillac || Bordeaux || 1973 || 
|-
| Cahors || South West France || 1971 || 
|-
| Cairanne || Rhone Valley || 2018 || 
|-| Canon Fronsac || Bordeaux || 1939 || Originally under the name Côtes Canon Fronsac, name changed to Canon Fronsac in 1964 
|-
| Cassis || Provence || 1936 || 
|-
| Cérons || Bordeaux || 1936 || 
|-
| Chablis || Burgundy || 1938 || 
|-
| Chablis Grand Cru || Burgundy || 1938 || 
|-
| Chablis Premier Cru || Burgundy || 1938 || 
|-
| Chambertin || Burgundy || 1937 || 
|-
| Chambertin-Clos-de-Beze || Burgundy || 1937 || 
|-
| Chambolle-Musigny || Burgundy || 1936 || 
|-
| Champagne || Champagne || 1936 || 
|-
| Chapelle-Chambertin || Burgundy || 1937 || 
|-
| Charlemagne || Burgundy || 1937 || 
|-
| Charmes-Chambertin || Burgundy || 1937 || 
|-
| Chassagne-Montrachet || Burgundy || 1970 || 
|-
| Château-Chalon || Jura || 1936 || 
|-
| Château-Grillet || Rhône || 1936 || 
|-
| Châteauneuf-du-Pape || Rhône || 1923 || 
|-
| Châtillon-en-Diois || Rhône || 1975 || 
|-
| Chaume || Loire || 2003 || Until 2003 and 2005-2007 a village designation within Coteaux du Layon. Created as a separate AOC in 2003 under the name Chaume Premier Cru des Coteaux du Layon, which was annulled in 2005. Chaume created anew as an AOC in 2007.
|-
| Chénas || Beaujolais || 1936 || 
|-
| Chevalier-Montrachet || Burgundy || 1937 || 
|-
| Cheverny || Loire || 1993 || 
|-
| Chinon || Loire || 1937 || 
|-
| Chiroubles || Beaujolais || 1936 || 
|-
| Chorey-les-Beaune || Burgundy || 1970 || 
|-
| Clairette de Bellegarde || Languedoc-Roussillon || 1949 || 
|-
| Clairette de Die || Rhône || 1993 || 
|-
| Clairette du Languedoc || Languedoc-Roussillon || 1948 || Original decree of 28 September 1948 updated 12 April 1965, 30 August 1972, and 15 November 1983
|-
| Clos des Lambrays || Burgundy || 1981 || Originally a Premier Cru vineyard in Morey-Saint-Denis
|-
| Clos de la Roche || Burgundy || 1936 || 
|-
| Clos de Tart || Burgundy || 1939 || 
|-
| Clos de Vougeot || Burgundy || 1937 || 
|-
| Clos Saint-Denis || Burgundy || 1936 || 
|-
| Collioure || Languedoc-Roussillon || 1971 || 
|-
| Condrieu || Rhône || 1940 || 
|-
| Corbieres || Languedoc-Roussillon || 1985 || 
|-
| Cornas || Rhône || 1938 || 
|-
| Corse or Vin de Corse || Corsica || 1976 || 
|-
| Corton || Burgundy || 1937 || 
|-
| Corton-Charlemagne || Burgundy || 1937 || 
|-
| Costières de Nîmes || Rhône || 1986 || Originally Costières du Gard, renamed to Costières de Nîmes in 1989, and in 2004 reassigned to the Rhône region
|-
| Côte de Beaune || Burgundy || 1970 || 
|-
| Côte de Beaune-Villages || Burgundy || 1970 || 
|-
| Côte de Brouilly || Beaujolais || 1938 || 
|-
| Côte de Nuits-villages || Burgundy || 1964 || 
|-
| Côte Roannaise || Loire || 1994 || 
|-
| Côte-Rôtie || Rhône || 1940 || 
|-
| Coteaux Champenois || Champagne || 1974 || 
|-
| Coteaux d'Aix-en-Provence || Provence || 1985 || 
|-
| Coteaux de Die || Rhône || 1993 || 
|-
| Coteaux de l'Aubance || Loire || 1950 || 
|-
| Coteaux de Pierrevert || Provence || 1998 || 
|-
| Coteaux du Giennois || Loire || 1998 || 
|-
| Coteaux du Languedoc || Languedoc-Roussillon || 1985 || 
|-
| Coteaux du Layon || Loire || 1950 || 
|-
| Coteaux du Loir || Loire || 1948 || 
|-
| Coteaux du Lyonnais || Lyonnais || 1984 || 
|-

| Coteaux du Quercy || South West France || 2011 || upgraded to AOC (AOP) from AOVDQS as disappear as label in 2011
|-

| Coteaux de Saumur || Loire || 1948 || 
|-
| Coteaux du Tricastin || Rhône || 1973 || 
|- (name changed in 2011 to Gringnan-les-Adhemar, in order to disassociate wine from negative publicity re building of nuclear power station at Tricastin)
| Coteaux du Vendômois || Loire || 2001 || 
|-
| Coteaux Varois || Provence || 1993 || 
|-
| Côtes de Bergerac || South West France || 1936 || 
|-
| Côtes de Bergerac Blanc || South West France || 1936 || 

|-
| Côtes de Blaye || Bordeaux || 1995 || Formerly part of Blaye
|-
| Côtes de Bordeaux Saint-Macaire || Bordeaux || 1937 || 
|-
| Côtes de Bourg || Bordeaux || 1936 || AOC in 1936 for red wines, in 1941 for white wines
|-
| Côtes de Castillon || Bordeaux || 1989 || Separate AOC in 1989, formerly Côtes de Castillon could be added to Bordeaux AOC
|-
| Côtes de Duras || South West France || 1937 || 
|-
| Côtes du Forez || Loire || 2000 || 
|-
| Côtes de la Malepere || Languedoc || 2007 || 
|-

| Côtes de Millau || South West France || 2011 || upgraded to AOC (AOP) from AOVDQS as disappear as label in 2011
|-

| Côtes de Montravel || South West France || 1937 || 
|-
| Côtes de Provence || Provence || 1977 || 
|-
| Côtes de Toul || Eastern France || 1998 || 
|-
| Côtes du Jura || Jura || 1937 || 
|-
| Côtes du Luberon || Rhône || 1988 || 
|-
| Côtes du Marmandais || South West France || 1990 || 
|-
| Côtes du Rhône || Rhône || 1937 || 
|-
| Côtes du Rhône Villages || Rhône || 1966 || 
|-
| Côtes du Roussillon || Languedoc-Roussillon || 1977 || 
|-
| Côtes du Roussillon Villages || Languedoc-Roussillon || 1977 || 
|-
| Côtes du Ventoux || Rhône || 1973 || 
|-
| Côtes du Vivarais || Rhône || 1999 || 
|-
| Cour-Cheverny || Loire || 1993 || 
|-
| Crémant d'Alsace || Alsace || 1976 || 
|-
| Crémant de Bordeaux || Bordeaux || 1990 || 
|-
| Crémant de Bourgogne || Burgundy || 1975 || 
|-
| Crémant de Die || Rhône || 1993 || 
|-
| Crémant du Jura || Jura || 1995 || 
|-
| Crémant de Limoux || Languedoc-Roussillon || 1990 || 
|-
| Crémant de Loire || Loire || 1975 || 
|-
| Crépy || Savoy || 1948 || 
|-
| Criots-Bâtard-Montrachet || Burgundy || 1937 || 
|-
| Crozes-Hermitage || Rhône || 1937 || 
|-
| Échezeaux || Burgundy || 1937 || 
|-
| Entre-Deux-Mers || Bordeaux || 1937 || 
|-
| Entre-Deux-Mers-Haut-Benauge || Bordeaux || 1937 || 
|-
| Faugeres || Languedoc-Roussillon || 1982 || 
|-
| Fitou || Languedoc-Roussillon || 1948 || 
|-
| Fixin || Burgundy || 1936 || 
|-
| Fleurie || Beaujolais || 1936 || 
|-
| Fronsac || Bordeaux || 1937 || Originally Côtes de Fronsac, name changed to Fronsac in 1976
|-
| Frontignan || Languedoc-Roussillon || 1936 || 
|-
| Fronton || South West France || 1975 || Originally under the name Côtes du Frontonnais, name changed to Fronton in 2005
|-
| Gaillac || South West France || 1970 || 
|-
| Gaillac Premieres Côtess || South West France || 1970 || 
|-
| Gevrey-Chambertin || Burgundy || 1936 || 
|-
| Gigondas || Rhône || 1971 || 
|-
| Givry || Burgundy || 1946 || 
|-
| Grand Roussillon || Languedoc-Roussillon || 1972 || 
|-
| Grands Échezeaux || Burgundy || 1936 || 
|-
| Graves || Bordeaux || 1937 || 
|-
| Graves de Vayres || Bordeaux || 1937 || 
|-
| Graves Supérieures || Bordeaux || 1937 || 
|-
| Griotte-Chambertin || Burgundy || 1937 || 
|-
| Haut-Médoc || Bordeaux || 1936 || 
|-
| Haut-Montravel || South West France || 1937 || 
|-
| Haut-Poitou || Loire  || 2011|| 
|-
| Hermitage || Rhône || 1937 || 
|-
| Irancy || Burgundy || 1999 || The designation Bourgogne Irancy existed since 1937
|-
| Irouléguy || South West France || 1970 || 
|-
| Jasnieres || Loire || 1937 || 
|-
| Juliénas || Beaujolais || 1938 || 
|-
| Jurançon || South West France || 1936 || 
|-
| L'Étoile || Jura || 1937 || 
|-
| Ladoix || Burgundy || 1970 || 
|-
| La Grande Rue || Burgundy || 1936 || 
|-
| Lalande-de-Pomerol || Bordeaux || 1936 || 
|-
| La Romanée || Burgundy || 1936 || 
|-
| La Tâche || Burgundy || 1936 || 
|-
| Latricieres-Chambertin || Burgundy || 1937 || 
|-
| Les Baux-de-Provence || Provence || 1995 || Before 1995 a part of Coteaux d'Aix-en-Provence AOC
|-
| Limoux || Languedoc-Roussillon || 1981 || 
|-
| Lirac || Rhône || 1947 || 
|-
| Listrac-Médoc || Bordeaux || 1957 || Separate AOC in 1957 under the name Listrac, also part of the area for Haut-Médoc. Change of name to Listrac-Médoc in 1986.
|-
| Loupiac || Bordeaux || 1936 || 
|-
| Lussac-Saint-Émilion || Bordeaux || 1936 || 
|-
| Mâcon || Burgundy || 1937 || 
|-
| Mâcon supérieur || Burgundy || 1937 || 
|-
| Mâcon-villages || Burgundy || 1937 || 
|-
| Madiran || South West France || 1948 || 
|-
| Maranges || Burgundy || 1989 || 
|-
| Marcillac || South West France || 1990 || 
|-
| Margaux || Bordeaux || 1936 || 
|-
| Marsannay || Burgundy || 1987 || 
|-
| Maury || Languedoc-Roussillon || 1972 || 
|-
| Mazis-Chambertin || Burgundy || 1937 || 
|-
| Mazoyeres-Chambertin || Burgundy || 1937 || 
|-
| Médoc || Bordeaux || 1936 || 
|-
| Menetou-Salon || Loire || 1959 || 
|-
| Mercurey || Burgundy || 1936 || 
|-
| Meursault || Burgundy || 1970 || 
|-
| Minervois || Languedoc-Roussillon || 1985 || 
|-
| Minervois-La Liviniere || Languedoc-Roussillon || 1999 || 
|-
| Monbazillac || South West France || 1936 || 
|-
| Montagne Saint-Émilion || Bordeaux || 1936 || 
|-
| Montagny || Burgundy || 1936 || 
|-
| Monthelie || Burgundy || 1970 || 
|-
| Montlouis || Loire || 1938 || 
|-
| Montrachet || Burgundy || 1937 || 
|-
| Montravel || South West France || 1937 || 
|-
| Morey-Saint-Denis || Burgundy || 1936 || 
|-
| Morgon || Beaujolais || 1936 || 
|-
| Moulin a vent || Beaujolais || 1936 || 
|-
| Moulis or Moulis-en-Médoc || Bordeaux || 1938 || 
|-
| Muscadet || Loire || 1937 || 
|-
| Muscadet-Coteaux de la Loire || Loire || 1936 || 
|-
| Muscadet-Côtes de Grandlieu || Loire || 1994 || 
|-
| Muscadet-Sevre et Maine || Loire || 1936 || also written Muscadet de Sèvre et Maine
|-
| Muscat de Beaumes-de-Venise || Rhône || 1945 || 
|-
| Muscat de Frontignan || Languedoc-Roussillon || 1936 || 
|-
| Muscat de Lunel || Languedoc-Roussillon || 1943 || 
|-
| Muscat de Mireval || Languedoc-Roussillon || 1959 || 
|-
| Muscat de Rivesaltes || Languedoc-Roussillon || 1972 || 
|-
| Muscat de Saint-Jean de Minervois|| Languedoc-Roussillon || 1949 || 
|-
| Musigny || Burgundy || 1936 || 
|-
| Néac || Bordeaux || 1936 || 
|-
| Nuits-Saint-Georges || Burgundy || 1972 || 
|-
| Orléans || Loire || 2006 || 
|-
| Orléans-Cléry || Loire || 2006 || 
|-
| Pacherenc du Vic-Bilh || South West France || 1948 || 
|-
| Pacherenc du Vic-Bilh Sec || South West France || 1948 || 
|-
| Palette || Provence || 1948 || 
|-
| Patrimonio || Corsica || 1984 || Before 1984 a designation within Corse or Vin du Corse
|-
| Pauillac || Bordeaux || 1936 || 
|-
| Pécharmant || South West France || 1946 || 
|-
| Pernand-Vergelesses || Burgundy || 1970 || 
|-
| Pessac-Léognan || Bordeaux || 1987 || Before 1987 part of Graves AOC
|-
| Petit Chablis || Burgundy || 1944 || 
|-
| Pomerol || Bordeaux || 1936 || 
|-
| Pommard || Burgundy || 1936 || 
|-
| Pouilly-Fuissé || Burgundy || 1936 || 
|-
| Pouilly-Fumé || Loire || 1937 || May also be written Blanc Fumé de Pouilly
|-
| Pouilly-Loché || Burgundy || 1940 || 
|-
| Pouilly-sur-Loire || Loire || 1937 || 
|-
| Pouilly-Vinzelles || Burgundy || 1940 || 
|-
| Premieres Côtes de Blaye || Bordeaux || 1994 || Before 1994 part of Blaye
|-
| Premieres Côtes de Bordeaux || Bordeaux || 1937 || 
|-
| Puisseguin Saint-Émilion || Bordeaux || 1936 || 
|-
| Puligny-Montrachet || Burgundy || 1970 || 
|-
| Quarts de Chaume || Loire || 1954 || 
|-
| Quincy || Loire || 1936 || 
|-
| Régnié || Beaujolais || 1988 || 
|-
| Reuilly || Loire || 1937 || 
|-
| Richebourg || Burgundy || 1936 || 
|-
| Rivesaltes || Languedoc-Roussillon || 1997 || 
|-
| Romanée-Conti || Burgundy || 1936 || 
|-
| Romanée-Saint-Vivant || Burgundy || 1936 || 
|-
| Rosé d'Anjou || Loire || 1936 || 
|-
| Rosé de Loire || Loire || 1974 || 
|-
| Rosé des Riceys || Champagne || 1971 || 
|-
| Rosette || South West France || 1946 || 
|-
| Roussette de Savoie || Savoy || 1973 || 
|-
| Roussette du Bugey || Bugey || 2009 || 
|-
| Ruchottes-Chambertin || Burgundy || 1937 || 
|-
| Rully || Burgundy || 1939 || 
|-
| Saint-Amour || Beaujolais || 1946 || 
|-
| Saint-Aubin || Burgundy || 1970 || 
|-
| Saint-Bris || Burgundy || 2003 || As VDQS previously known as Sauvignon de Saint-Bris
|-
| Saint-Chinian || Languedoc-Roussillon || 1982 || 
|-
| Saint-Émilion || Bordeaux || 1936 || 
|-
| Saint-Émilion Grand Cru || Bordeaux || 1936 || 
|-
| Saint-Estephe || Bordeaux || 1936 || 
|-
| Saint-Georges Saint-Émilion || Bordeaux || 1936 || 
|-
| Saint-Joseph || Rhône || 1956 || 
|-
| Saint-Julien || Bordeaux || 1936 || 
|-

| Saint-Mont || South West France || 2011 || upgraded to AOC (AOP) from AOVDQS as disappear as label in 2011
|-

| Saint-Nicolas-de-Bourgueil || Loire || 1937 || 
|-
| Saint-Péray || Rhône || 1936 || 
|-
| Saint-Pourçain || Loire || 2009 || 
|-
| Saint-Romain || Burgundy || 1970 || 
|-

| Saint-Sardos || South West France || 2011 || upgraded to AOC (AOP) from AOVDQS as disappear as label in 2011
|-

| Saint-Véran || Burgundy || 1971 || 
|-
| Sainte-Croix-du-Mont || Bordeaux || 1936 || 
|-
| Sainte-Foy-Bordeaux || Bordeaux || 1937 || 
|-
| Sancerre || Loire || 1936 || 
|-
| Santenay || Burgundy || 1970 || 
|-
| Saumur || Loire || 1936 || 
|-
| Saumur-Champigny || Loire || 1936 || 
|-
| Saumur mousseux || Loire || 1976 || 
|-
| Saussignac || South West France || 1982 || 
|-
| Sauternes || Bordeaux || 1936 || 
|-
| Savennières || Loire || 1952 || 
|-
| Savennières-Coulée-de-Serrant || Loire || 1952 || 
|-
| Savennières-Roche-aux-Moines || Loire || 1952 || 
|-
| Savigny-les-Beaune || Burgundy || 1970 || 
|-
| Seyssel || Savoy || 1942 || 
|-
| Tavel || Rhône || 1936 || 
|-
| Tonnerre || Burgundy || 2006 || 
|-
| Touraine || Loire || 1939 || Originally called Coteaux de Touraine, changed to Touraine in 1953
|-
| Touraine-Amboise || Loire || 1939 || 
|-
| Touraine-Azay-le-Rideau || Loire || 1939 || 
|-
| Touraine-Mesland || Loire || 1939 || 
|-
| Touraine Noble Joué || Loire || 2001 || 
|-
| Tursan || South West France || 2011 || upgraded to AOC (AOP) from AOVDQS as disappear as label in 2011
|-
| Vacqueyras || Rhône || 1990 || 
|-
| Valençay || Loire || 2004 || 
|-
| Vin de Savoie || Savoy || 1973 || 
|-

| Vins d'Entraygues et du Fel || South West France || 2011 || upgraded to AOC (AOP) from AOVDQS as disappear as label in 2011
|-

| Vins d'Estaing || South West France || 2011 || upgraded to AOC (AOP) from AOVDQS as disappear as label in 2011
|-

| Vins Fins de la Côte de Nuits || Burgundy || 1964 || 
|-
| Viré-Clessé || Burgundy || 1999 || Previously the two designations Mâcon-Clessé and Mâcon-Viré existed within Mâcon AOC since 1937
|-
| Vinsobres || Rhône || 2006 || Separate AOC in 2006, previously a part of Côtes du Rhône Villages
|-
| Volnay || Burgundy || 1937 || 
|-
| Volnay Santenots || Burgundy || 1937 || 
|-
| Vosne-Romanée || Burgundy || 1936 || 
|-
| Vougeot || Burgundy || 1936 || 
|-
| Vouvray || Loire || 1936 || 
|}

See also
List of Appellation d'Origine Contrôlée liqueurs and spirits
List of VDQS wines
List of Vins de Primeur

External links
Terroir-France:AOC list, sorted by region
Arrêté du 19 juillet 2004 relatif à la composition des comités régionaux vins et eaux-de-vie de l'Institut national des appellations d'origine 
Europa.eu: Wine sector: List of quality wines produced in specified regions

French wine AOCs
Appellations